San Pedro de Coris District is one of ten districts of the province Churcampa in Peru.

See also 
 Allquchayuq
 Yana Urqu

References